Zhang Qing may refer to:

Zhang Qing (Featherless Arrow), fictional character in Water Margin
Zhang Qing (Gardener), fictional character in Water Margin
Zhang Qing (speed skater) (born 1966), Chinese Olympic speed skater
Zhang Qing (biathlete) (born 1980), Chinese skier
Jasmine Zhang (born 1978), or Zhang Qing, Chinese talk show host